The 1991–92 South Midlands League season was 63rd in the history of South Midlands League.

Premier Division

The Premier Division featured 18 clubs which competed in the division last season, along with 4 new clubs:
Buckingham Athletic, promoted from Division One 
Oxford City, promoted from Division One
Leverstock Green, joined from Herts Senior County League Premier Division
Potters Bar Town, joined from Herts Senior County League Premier Division

League table

Division One

The Division One featured 16 clubs which competed in the division last season, along with 4 new clubs:
Luton Old Boys
Bedford Town
Ampthill Town, transferred from the United Counties League Division One
Emberton

League table

References

1991–92
8